The 2020–21 Lebanese Premier League was the 59th season of the Lebanese Premier League, the top Lebanese professional league for association football clubs since its establishment in 1934. The league was initially scheduled to start on 18 September, before being postponed to 3 October as part of preventive measures by the state towards the COVID-19 pandemic.

It was the first season to feature a "split" format, in which the season was divided into two phases. In the first phase, each club played against each other once, for a total of 11 matchdays. In the second phase, the league was split into two halves – the "top six" and the "bottom six". Points were carried over from the first phase, and each club played five games within its own half. Due to the COVID-19 pandemic, all games in the season were played behind closed doors.

Since the 2019–20 season was cancelled, Ahed were the three-time defending champions, having won their 7th title in the 2018–19 season. Ansar won their 14th Lebanese Premier League title, their first since 2007, beating Nejmeh in the Beirut derby 2–1 in the final matchday.

Summary

Regulations 
On 24 June 2020, a player quota for the season was announced. Each club had to involve one player under the age of 22 for at least 600 minutes, two players for at least 800 combined minutes, and three players for at least 1,200 combined minutes. Also, each club was allowed a maximum of eight players over the age of 30, with only five being able to be fielded in a game. In case a club were to not meet the required number of minutes at the end of the season, they would have had three points deducted from their total in the league. Due to the economic situation in Lebanon, other regulations were introduced, namely the abolition of foreign players in the league.

Format 
The 2020–21 season consisted of two phases: in the first phase, each team played against one another once. In the second phase, the 12 teams were divided into two groups based on their position in the first phase; the teams carried over their point tally from the first phase. After the first phase was completed, clubs could not move out of their own half in the league, even if they achieved more or fewer points than a higher or lower ranked team, respectively. 

The top six teams played against each other once, with the champion automatically qualifying to the 2022 AFC Champions League qualifying play-offs—assuming they met the criteria set by the Asian Football Confederation (AFC). The runners-up instead directly qualified to the 2022 AFC Cup group stage—as long as the champions met the AFC criteria for the AFC Champions League. The bottom six teams also played against each other once, with the bottom two teams being relegated to the Lebanese Second Division.

Teams 

Twelve teams competed in the league – the top ten teams from the 2018–19 Lebanese Premier League season and the two teams promoted from the Second Division. Due to the 2019–20 season being cancelled, the same 12 teams participated in the 2020–21 season.

Stadiums and locations 

Prior to the start of each season, every team choose two stadiums as their home venues. In case both stadiums were unavailable for a certain matchday, another venue was used.

Note: Table lists in alphabetical order.

League table

Results

Matches 1–11
Teams play each other once.

Matches 12–16 
After 11 matches, the league splits into two sections of six teams i.e. the top six and the bottom six, with the teams playing every other team in their section once.

Top six

Bottom six

Season statistics

Scoring

Top goalscorers

Hat-tricks

Most assists

Clean sheets

Discipline

Player 

 Most yellow cards: 8
  Jihad Ayoub (Ansar)
  Zouhair Abdallah (Shabab Sahel)

 Most red cards: 1
  Yasser Achour (Shabab Bourj)
  Ali Rmeity (Shabab Bourj)
  Hussein Sayed (Chabab Ghazieh)
  Kazzem Attieh (Tadamon Sour)
  Ali Abdallah Bitar (Tadamon Sour)
  Hussein Zein (Ahed)
  Ahmad Khatib (Bourj)

Notes

References

External links 

 

Lebanese Premier League seasons
Lebanon
1
Lebanese Premier League, 2020-21